The Prophet of Hunger is a 1970 Brazilian drama film directed by Maurice Capovila. It was entered into the 20th Berlin International Film Festival.

Cast
 José Mojica Marins - Fakir Ali Khan
 Maurício do Valle - Lion Tamer
 Julia Miranda - Maria
 Sérgio Hingst - Dom José (circus owner)
 Joffre Soares - Priest
 Adauto Santos
 Eládio Brito
 Flávio Império
 Lenoir Bittencourt
 Mário Lima
 Angelo Mataran
 Luiz Abreu
 Jean-Claude Bernardet
 Hamilton de Almeida

References

External links

1970 drama films
1970 films
Brazilian black-and-white films
Brazilian drama films
Films directed by Maurice Capovila
1970s Portuguese-language films